
Halsted may refer to:

People with the surname
 Anna Roosevelt Halsted (1906–1975), first child of Franklin Delano Roosevelt
 Byron Halsted (1852–1918), American biologist and educator
 Fred Halsted (1941—1989), American gay pornographer
 George Bruce Halsted (1853–1922), American mathematician
 John Halsted (1761-1830), Royal Navy officer
 John B. Halsted (born 1798), New York politician
 Laurence Halsted (born 1984), British fencer
 Lawrence Halsted (1764-1841), Royal Navy admiral
 Nick Halsted (1942-2007), British fencer
 William Stewart Halsted (1852–1922), pioneering American surgeon

Train stations
UIC–Halsted station, on the CTA Blue Line
Halsted station (CTA Metropolitan Main Line), the predecessor of the Blue Line station
Halsted station (CTA Green Line), on the Englewood branch of the CTA Green Line
Halsted station (CTA Orange Line), in Chicago
Halsted station (CTA North Side Main Line), on what is now part of the CTA Brown Line
Halsted station (CTA Green Line Lake branch), a former station
Halsted Street station, on the Metra BNSF Railway line

Other
Halsted, Denmark, a small village on the Danish island of Lolland
Halsted Priory and the associated Halsted Church, Denmark
Halsted Street, a major street in Chicago
, the name of more than one ship of the British Royal Navy
, the name of more than one ship of the United States Navy

See also 
 Halstead (disambiguation)